Charles Bunnell may refer to:

Charles E. Bunnell (1878–1956), president of the University of Alaska
Charles Ragland Bunnell (1897–1968), painter and muralist
 Charles Sterling Bunnell (1901–1988), American banker

See also
Frank Charles Bunnell (1842–1911), Republican member of the U.S. House of Representatives from Pennsylvania